Peter William Broeker (born 15 May 1926 in Germany – died 4 November 1980 in Ottawa) was a racing driver from Canada. He participated in one World Championship Formula One Grand Prix, the 1963 United States Grand Prix, driving a Stebro, a car of his own construction.  He finished seventh, albeit 22 laps down, and scored no championship points. According to the Toronto Star at the time: "Broeker, first Canadian ever to compete in a world championship Formula One race in a Canadian-built car, finished seventh over-all despite giving away more than 80 horsepower to the rest of the field of 21." He owned Stebro, an aftermarkets performance parts company that is still in operation.

In 1973 Broeker wrote and published Olympic Coins: From Antiquity to the Present. He held US citizenship as well as Canadian.

Complete Formula One results
(key)

References

1926 births
1980 deaths
Atlantic Championship drivers
Racing drivers from Ontario
Canadian Formula One drivers
Stebro Formula One drivers

Formula One team owners
German emigrants to Canada